Hairy woodrush may refer to 

Luzula acuminata, a plant in North America
Luzula pilosa, a plant in Europe and West Asia